Sherman W. Wade (December 12, 1895 – December 11, 1969) was a member of the Wisconsin State Senate.

Biography
Wade was born on December 12, 1895, in Hurley, Wisconsin. During World War I, he served in the United States Army's 102nd Squadron. He died on December 11, 1969.

Political career
Wade was elected to the Senate in 1932. He was a Democrat.

References

People from Hurley, Wisconsin
Democratic Party Wisconsin state senators
Military personnel from Wisconsin
United States Army personnel of World War I
United States Army soldiers
1895 births
1969 deaths
20th-century American politicians